Strejček (feminine Strejčková) is a Czech surname. Notable people with the surname include:

 Ivo Strejček (born 1962), Czech politician
 Jarmila Nygrýnová-Strejčková (1953–1999), Czech athlete
 Miroslav Strejček (1929–2000), Czech rower

Czech-language surnames